Facundo Maximiliano Moreira Burgos (born 27 February 1989) is a Uruguayan footballer who plays as a midfielder for C.A. Cerro.

References

External links
Profile at ESPN FC

1989 births
Living people
Uruguayan footballers
Uruguayan expatriate footballers
Miramar Misiones players
C.A. Rentistas players
Boston River players
El Tanque Sisley players
C.A. Cerro players
Metropolitanos FC players
Caracas FC players
C.A. Progreso players
Trujillanos FC players
Uruguayan Primera División players
Uruguayan Segunda División players
Venezuelan Primera División players
Uruguayan expatriate sportspeople in Venezuela
Expatriate footballers in Venezuela
Association football midfielders
21st-century Uruguayan people